Floral Green is the second studio album by American rock band Title Fight.

Production and composition
It was recorded with producer Will Yip at Studio 4 in Conshohocken, Pennsylvania.

The album's sound has been described as melodic hardcore, post-hardcore, emo, art rock,  and shoegazing.

Release
On July 8, 2012, posted a picture with the caption "September 2012". The following day, the group's label SideOneDummy Records posted album artwork for Floral Green. On July 24, "Head in the Ceiling Fan" was made available for streaming and as a free download via the group's website. A music video was released for "Head in the Ceiling Fan", directed by Grey Zine guitarist Evan Evans. In August, the band performed at This Is Hardcore festival. It was made available for streaming through NME on 14 September and released a few days later through SideOneDummy Records. In September and October, the band went on European tour with La Dispute and Make Do and Mend. The band performed a celebratory release show for the album on October 19. German alternative music magazine Visions included the CD version of the album in their October 2012 issue and in its review section awarded it their album of the month.

In October and November, the group went on a headlining US tour with main support from Pianos Become the Teeth and Single Mothers. They were also supported on select dates by Tigers Jaw, Whirr, Power Trip and Face Reality. On September 4, a music video was released for "Secret Society", directed by Hannah Roman. A 7" vinyl was released featuring "Secret Society" and an untitled B-side. In March 2013, the band went on a tour of Australia with support from Luca Brasi. In April and May, the group went on tour of Europe and the UK with support from Dead End Path and Whirr. In August, the group appeared at FYF Fest. In September and October, the band went on a headlining US tour with support from Balance And Composure, Cruel Hand and Slingshot Dakota. In November, the band performed at Fun Fun Fun Fest.

Reception

It peaked at number 69 on the Billboard Top 200. The album was included in TheWaster's top albums of 2012 list, and was later named the 29th best album of the 2010s by Chorus.fm.

Track list

All songs written by Title Fight

Personnel 
 Band
Jamie Rhoden – guitar, vocals
Ned Russin – bass, vocals
Shane Moran – guitar
Ben Russin – drums

 Production
 Will Yip – production, sound engineer, mixing
 Adam Ayan – mastering
 Phil Nicolo – mixing
 Jay Preston – mixing
 Colin Gorman – mixing
 Isaac Gonzales – layout
 Manny Mares – photography
 John Garrett Slaby – artwork

Chart performance

References 

Title Fight albums
2012 albums
SideOneDummy Records albums
Albums produced by Will Yip